Antanas Čikotas (2 June 1951 – May 2021) was a Lithuanian rower. He competed in the men's eight event at the 1976 Summer Olympics.

References

External links
 

1951 births
2021 deaths
Lithuanian male rowers
Olympic rowers of the Soviet Union
Rowers at the 1976 Summer Olympics
People from Prienai District Municipality